The Gallorommatidae is an extinct family of microscopic parasitoid wasps, belonging to the Mymarommatoidea. It is known from several species found in Cretaceous aged amber.

Species
†Galloromma 
†Galloromma agapa from Taimyr amber, Late Cretaceous (Cenomanian)
†Galloromma alavaensis from trhe Escucha Formation, Early Cretaceous (Albian)
†Galloromma bezonnaisensis from Bezonnais amber, France, Late Cretaceous (Cenomanian)
†Galloromma kachinensis from Burmese amber, mid Cretaceous (latest Albian-earliest Cenomanian)
†Cretaceomma
†Cretaceomma libanensis from Lebanese amber, Early Cretaceous (Barremian)
†Cretaceomma turolensis also from the Eschucha Formation.

References

Parasitica
†
Prehistoric hymenoptera